Board of Trade of City of Chicago v. Olsen, 262 U.S. 1 (1923), is a United States Supreme Court decision in which the Court upheld the Grain Futures Act as constitutional under the Commerce Clause of the United States Constitution.

See also 
 List of United States Supreme Court cases, volume 262

References

External links 
 
 

United States Constitution Article One case law
United States Supreme Court cases
United States Commerce Clause case law
United States commodity and futures case law
1923 in United States case law
Chicago Board of Trade litigation
United States Supreme Court cases of the Taft Court